Porno may refer to:

 Pornography, explicit depiction of sexual subject matter with principal intention of sexually exciting a viewer
Pornographic magazine
Pornographic film
 Porno (film), a 2019 American film
 Porno (novel), a 2002 novel by Irvine Welsh
 Porno for Pyros, an American musical group
 Zack and Miri Make a Porno, a 2008 comedic film